Synsepalum subverticillatum is a species of flowering plant in the family Sapotaceae. It is endemic to Kenya.

References

Endemic flora of Kenya
subverticillatum
Endangered plants
Taxonomy articles created by Polbot
Plants described in 1991